Smt. Rama Agrahari Mahila/Balika Degree College  (HIndi: श्रीमती रामा अग्रहरि महिला/बालिका महाविद्यालय) is located at Rama Nagar, Deviganj city, Fatehpur, Uttar Pradesh. The college was established in 2010 by Radhe Shyam Gupta, MLA and former  Minister of Uttar Pradesh.

Courses 
The courses are B.A. in Art faculty & B.Sc. Biology & Math's group in Science faculty.

Arts faculty 
Hindi Literature
English Language
Hindi Language
Sanskrit
Social science
home science

Science faculty 

Physics
Chemistry
Math's
Botany
Zoology

Infrastructure 
The college has its own building with well aerated big size alighted rooms with sound proof, well furnished students furniture reading rooms, Library, Laboratories, Administrative Building, Toilets, Drinking Water, Sports facilities are available.

References

External links
Official website

Women's universities and colleges in Uttar Pradesh
Fatehpur, Uttar Pradesh
2010 establishments in Uttar Pradesh
Educational institutions established in 2010